Strigopteroides is a genus of beetles in the family Buprestidae, containing the following species:

 Strigopteroides aegyptiaca (Gmelin, 1790)
 Strigopteroides margotanae Novak, 1995
 Strigopteroides semenowi (Obenberger, 1934)

References

Buprestidae genera